"Let Erin Remember" is a traditional Irish song. The song is often played on the bagpipes.

History

Performances and use
In 1920 the song was played at the funeral of hunger striker, Terence MacSwiney

In the 1924 Olympics the song was used by Irish athletes in the absence of a national anthem.

The Irish Guards regiment of the British Army use the song when slow marching.

References

External links
 A recording of the song

Irish folk songs
Historical national anthems